Wickede, officially Wickede (Ruhr), is a municipality in the district of Soest, in North Rhine-Westphalia, Germany. Wickede lists the town of Jemielnica in Poland as its twin city and enjoys the cultural exchange and relationship.

Geography
Wickede (Ruhr) is situated on the river Ruhr which runs directly through the town and shapes the townscape. Wickede (Ruhr) is situated approximately 20 km south of Hamm and 20 km south-west of Soest. The town encompasses 25.2 square kilometers and is located on the southern flank of a hill called "Haarstrang".

Neighbouring municipalities

 Arnsberg
 Ense
 Fröndenberg
 Menden
 Unna
 Werl

Division of the town 
After the local government reforms of 1969 Wickede consists of 5 districts:
 Echthausen (1.622 inhabitants)
 Schlückingen (218 inhabitants)
 Wiehagen (1.452 inhabitants)
 Wimbern (1.003 inhabitants)
 Wickede (8.564 inhabitants)

Notable people 
 Fritz Steinhoff (1897-1969), German politician (SPD)

References

External links
 Official site 

Soest (district)